Michael Jeffery (1937–2020) was the 24th Governor-General of Australia.

Michael or Mike Jeffery may also refer to:
 Michael Jeffery (manager) (1933–1973), music business manager
 Mike Jeffery, Canadian Army general

See also
 Michael Jeffrey (born 1971), professional football player
 Mike Jeffries (disambiguation)